Pultenaea empetrifolia is a species of flowering plant in the family Fabaceae and is endemic to the south-west of Western Australia. It is a spindly, prostrate or spreading shrub with down-curved, cylindrical, grooved leaves and yellow to orange and red flowers.

Description
Flowering occurs from September to October and the fruit is a pod.

Taxonomy and naming
Pultenaea empetrifolia was first formally described in 1844 by Carl Meissner in Lehmann's Plantae Preissianae. The specific epithet (empetrifolia) means "Empetrum-leaved".

Distribution
This pultenaea is widespread in the Avon Wheatbelt, Esperance Plains, Jarrah Forest and Mallee biogeographic regions of south-western Western Australia.

Conservation status
Pultenaea empetrifolia is classified as "not threatened" by the Government of Western Australia Department of Parks and Wildlife.

References

empetrifolia
Eudicots of Western Australia
Plants described in 1844
Taxa named by Carl Meissner